Iran has participated at the Summer and Winter Youth Olympic Games in every edition since the inaugural 2010 Games and 2012 Games.

Medal tables

Medals by Summer Games

Medals by Winter Games

Medals by sports

Summer

Winter
No medals won.

List of medalists

Summer Games

2010

2014

2018

Flag bearers

See also
Iran at the Olympics
Iran at the Paralympics

References

External links
National Olympic Committee of the Iran

 
Nations at the Youth Olympic Games
Youth sport in Iran